James Muirden (born 1942) is a British astronomer and author of more than thirty books. He has formerly been a film reviewer and telescope maker. Muirden is a member of the British Astronomical Association. He lives in Devon, England.

Selected bibliography 
Astronomy with Binoculars (Faber, 1963)
Amateur Astronomer's Handbook (Crowell, 1968)
Beginner's Guide to Astronomical Telescope Making (Transatlantic Arts, 1976)
Observational Astronomy for Amateurs (Enslow Publishers, 1982)
Observer's Guide to Halley's Comet (Arco Pub, 1985)
A Rhyming History of Britain (Walker and Company, 2003)
The Cosmic Verses: A Rhyming History of the Universe (Walker and Company, 2007)

References 

1942 births
Living people
20th-century British astronomers
20th-century British non-fiction writers
21st-century British non-fiction writers